Adrian Roman Petriw (born August 5, 1987) is a Canadian television, film and voice actor. He is best known for his voice role of Tony Stark / Iron Man in the television series Iron Man: Armored Adventures, Commander Gren in The Dragon Prince, and Adam in the Netflix Original series The Hollow. His notable film and television credits include Legends of Tomorrow, Loudermilk, Van Helsing, iZombie, Lucifer, Hell On Wheels, Arrow, and Project Mc2. His first voice acting role was in Next Avengers: Heroes of Tomorrow.

Personal life
Petriw is of Ukrainian descent.

His nephew Dean Petriw, is also an actor for his role, Home Before Dark.

Live-action roles

Voice-over roles

Animated films

Animated television

Video games
 Thimbleweed Park
 Dead Rising 4
 Dragalia Lost

References

External links
 Official website
 
 

1987 births
Living people
Canadian male voice actors
Male actors from Toronto
Canadian people of Ukrainian descent